Chimaera bahamaensis, commonly known as the  Bahamas ghost shark, is a species of fish in the family Chimaeridae. It is found in North Atlantic Ocean around the Bahamas, specifically it has been found east of Andros Island. Chimaera bahamaensi is known to inhabit marine waters from a depth range of  – . It is one of the most recently described members of the genus Chimaera and to date only a single specimen has been found.

The chimaera bahamaensis displays a combination of morphometric features which include a short pectoral-pelvic space with a long pelvic-caudal space, a long pre-narial length, and a relatively large body that is uniformly caramel brown with dark brown fins.

References

bahamensis
Taxa named by David A. Ebert
Taxa named by Dominique A. Didier Dagit
Taxa named by Leonard Compagno
Fish described in 2010